Hypericum confertum is a species of flowering plant of the St. John's Wort family (Hypericaceae) which is native from Turkey to Lebanon and on the island of Cyprus.

References

confertum
Flora of Asia